Barunga, formerly known as Beswick Creek and then Bamyili, is a small Aboriginal community located approximately  southeast of Katherine, in the Northern Territory of Australia. It is part of the Roper Gulf Region local government area.

In mid June each year, the Barunga Festival, a three-day event showcasing Australian Aboriginal culture, is held. At the 1988 event, the Barunga Statement, which requested a treaty between the Australian federal government and Indigenous Australians (Aboriginal and Torres Strait Islander peoples), was presented to then prime minister Bob Hawke. Just before the 2018 Festival, the Barunga agreement was signed between the Northern Territory Government and all four land councils.

History

Aboriginal people have lived in Barunga and the surrounding region for thousands of years.

Maranboy tin mine
In September 1913, a goldfield named Maranboy was declared for a period of two years.

Tin was discovered at Maranboy in 1913 by prospectors Scharber and Richardson. Tin mines and a battery were operational in the same year. Prospectors of European, Chinese and Aboriginal descent worked at Maranboy. The mine closed in 1949 for repairs but never reopened. Many of the Aboriginal people who serviced the mine returned to Beswick Creek.

Plane crash nearby
A Douglas DC-3 belonging to the Dutch Air Force crash-landed near Beswick Creek or Beswick (now Wugularr) in 1947. All passengers survived, with four crew travelling about  down the Katherine River to get help. After running out of food they killed one of two dogs they had with them. The wings were eventually removed and the remains of the plane were towed to Katherine.

Tandangal

The local people were not consulted about the choice of location nor the method of their removal to the settlement from the King River Compound.

In 1948, the Beswick community moved to Tandangal (sometimes known as "old Bamyili"), because of risk of flooding from recent heavy rains. An influenza epidemic spread through the community in May 1951.

In June 1951 the people were relocated to the new site, initially known as Beswick Creek Native Settlement, and Tandangal was condemned.

Back to Beswick
By November 1951 the 'flu had killed seven people.

In early 1951, the Northern Territory Government started to develop the Beswick Creek community, building basic housing infrastructure and creating some minor employment opportunities. Local farmers also employed Aboriginal people, even running a peanut farm at Beswick Creek. The farm only lasted a few years. As Beswick grew, new groups formed a camp on the other side of the river known as "The Compound" where the people made humpies.

1950s to present
The Barunga school was first opened in 1954 with 42 children enrolled.

The elders changed the name of "The Compound" to Bamyili in 1965. In 1984, it changed its name to Barunga.

Australian cycling champion Cadel Evans spent his early childhood in Barunga, in the late 1970s and early 1980s.

In 1985 the Barunga Festival was first held. In 1988, the Barunga Statement was presented to the prime minister at the event. (See below for detail.)

Barunga Festival

Bangardi Robert Lee (1952–2005), a leader of the Bagala clan of the Jawoyn people, initiated the Barunga Sport and Cultural Festival in 1985. It became an important forum for sharing ideas, showcasing the Aboriginal Australian and Torres Strait Islander cultures and talent, and to engage with social and political issues.

It has become an annual music and cultural celebration, held on the Queen's Birthday long weekend (second weekend) in June attracting over 4,000. It features a program of workshops, dancing ceremonies, traditional bush tucker-gathering, didgeridoo-making, basket weaving and musical performances and sport.

In 2018, popular Tiwi band B2M played at the festival.

The 2020 Festival was postponed from June to September, then cancelled due to the COVID-19 pandemic. The 2021 event went ahead as scheduled on 11-13 June. The number of interstate patrons was limited by the organisers, and some local Indigenous groups did not attend due to caution over COVID-19.

The Barunga Statement (1988)

In 1988, as part of Bicentennial celebrations, the prime minister of Australia Bob Hawke visited the Northern Territory for the Barunga Festival, where he was presented with a statement of Aboriginal political objectives by Galarrwuy Yunupingu and Wenten Rubuntja. Painted on a 1.2 metre square sheet of composite wood, it became known as the "Barunga Statement". It stated:

Prime Minister Hawke responded by saying that he wished to conclude a treaty between Aboriginal and other Australians by 1990, but his wish was not fulfilled. Controversy erupted over the exposure of sacred material in the bark painting, leading some Indigenous leaders to call for its return. Some leaders alleged the presentation of the painting resulted in at least ten deaths due to "munya", which translates as remorse in the Aboriginal system of payback.

In 1991, Hawke's last act as prime minister was to hang the Barunga Statement at Parliament House, Canberra. He did so one minute before Paul Keating was sworn in as the new prime minister, stating "its presence here calls on those who follow me, it demands of them that they continue efforts that they find solutions to the abundant problems that still face the Aboriginal people of this country".

Yothu Yindi song Treaty
In June 1991 Australian Aboriginal band, Yothu Yindi, wrote and released the hit song "Treaty" to commemorate the statement. Lead singer Mandawuy Yunupingu, with his older brother Galarrwuy, wanted to highlight the lack of progress on the treaty between Aboriginal peoples and the Federal Government. Mandawuy said:

"Bob Hawke visited the Territory. He went to this gathering in Barunga. And this is where he made a statement that there shall be a treaty between black and white Australia. Sitting around the camp fire, trying to work out a chord to the guitar, and around that camp fire, I said, "Well, I heard it on the radio. And I saw it on the television." That should be a catchphrase. And that's where 'Treaty' was born".

The Barunga agreement (2018)
On 8 June 2018, just before the opening of the Barunga Festival, the Northern Territory Government signed a Memorandum of Understanding (MoU), since known as the Barunga agreement, to begin talks with all four of the Territory's Aboriginal land councils, on the subject of a treaty. The agreement, which was drafted after a week of discussions which included about 200 elected members of the land councils, included some guiding principles, including that “Aboriginal people were the prior owners and occupiers of the land, seas and waters that are now called the NT of Australia”. The land councils involved are the Northern, Central, Anindilyakwa and Tiwi Land Councils. One of the essential elements was seen as truth telling, “Truth telling is critical. Unless we understand each other, and understand how we’ve been impacted even by the best intentions of the other side, it’s pretty hard to construct a new relationship”.

The only two surviving senior men of the nine who painted the Barunga statement in 1988, Rirratjingu clan leader Galarrwuy Yunupingu and fellow Yolngu leader Djambawa Marawili, were present on Friday as the treaty agreement was signed.

Facilities
Barunga School provides education for students from preschool to the middle years, with up to Year 12 supported by the NT Open Education Centre. , the school is developing links with Wugularr and Bulman schools through the Vocational Education and Training (VET) program. The school has six 6 teaching staff and 14 non-teaching staff, with 54 boys and 48 girl students, 99% with languages other than English as a first language. As a very remote school in an area of socioeconomic disadvantage, at this point most of its students do not fall into the top quarter of achievement (as per the NAPLAN statistics, but the number has been growing since 2011.

The Bagala Community Store opened in September 2017, after local women raised the need for good food at affordable prices. Run by eight staff, it is the only store in the NT entirely owned and operated by Indigenous people. it stocks fresh produce and other foods, as well as hardware, mechanical goods, small electrical appliances as well as major appliances.

The community has a health clinic, camping grounds, sports oval, basketball courts, softball pitch and council office.

See also 
 Uluru Statement from the Heart 
 Yirrkala bark petitions

References

Further reading
 Barunga Festival Official Website

Towns in the Northern Territory
Aboriginal communities in the Northern Territory